Kılavuz is a village in the Oğuzeli District, Gaziantep Province, Turkey. The village is inhabited by Turkmens,  Turkicized Arabs of the Damalha tribe, and Abdals of the Kurular tribe.

References

Villages in Oğuzeli District